Last Child is a 2017 South Korean mystery drama film written and directed by Shin Dong-seok in his directorial debut. It stars Choi Moo-sung, Kim Yeo-jin, and Sung Yoo-bin. The film received positive reviews from critics, who praised Shin's direction and the cast's performances (particularly of Sung).

Plot
Six months ago, Jin Sang-chul (Choi Moo-sung) and Lee Mi-sook (Kim Yeo-jin) lost their son Eun-chan who drowned while saving one of his friends, Yoon Gi-hyun (Sung Yu-bin). One day Sang-chul meets Gi-hyun..

Cast
 Choi Moo-sung as Jin Sung-chul
 Kim Yeo-jin as Lee Mi-sook
 Sung Yoo-bin as Yoon Ki-hyun
 Kim Kyung-ik as Oh Hyun-kyu
 Moon Young-dong as Paperhanging team leader
 Lee Hwa-ryong as Homeroom teacher
 Park Chan as Choi Joon-young
 Kim Do-young as Joon-young's mother
 Ryu Ui-hyun as Oh Jung-suk
 Jung Hee-joong as Han-suk
 Kim Sang-woo as Ji-hong
 Lee Min-jae as Sung-woo
 Jung Tae-sung as Ho-sung
 Gong Sang-ah as Ji-sook
 Sung Yul-suk as Civil servant
 Kim Choo-wol as Principal
 Kim Kwang-sik as CEO Sung
 Song Sook-hee as CEO Sung's wife
 Park Sung-yeon as Hyun-kyu's wife
 Eom Ok-ran as CEO Kim's wife
 Choi Yo-han as Ho-sung's father
 Yoon Boo-jin as Ji-hong's mother
 Lee Seung-hun as Ji-hong's father
 Kim Jae-man as Sung-woo's father
 Kim Ki-song as Detective Kim
 Jang Joon-hwi as Detective Choi
 Hong Sang-pyo as Detective Jung
 Jeon Suk-chan as District police officer
 Kim Joon-bum as Obstetrician
 Lee David as Jin Eun-chan (cameo)

Awards and nominations

References

External links
 
 
 
 

2017 films
2017 directorial debut films
2017 drama films
2017 independent films
2010s mystery drama films
South Korean independent films
South Korean mystery drama films
2010s Korean-language films
Films about grieving
2010s South Korean films